Tao Qianglong (born 20 November 2001) is a Chinese professional footballer who plays as a winger for Chinese Super League club Wuhan Three Towns.

Club career
In 2013, Tao was scouted as a promising youngster and invited to train with the youth teams of Spanish side Villarreal. He would return back to China and would play for the Beijing Guoan youth teams setup and the various age groups for the Chinese national team, which saw Hebei China Fortune interested in his services. Soon after completing his move to Hebei he was promoted to the first team and was handed his debut in a Chinese Super League game by the Head coach Chris Coleman on 2 March 2019 against Shenzhen F.C. where he came on as a substitute for Yin Hongbo in a 3-1 defeat. The manager would show considerable faith in Tao by continuing to play him, which saw Tao repay his faith in him by scoring his first goal for the club on 13 April 2019 in a league game against Chongqing Dangdai Lifan that ended in a 2-1 loss. By the end of the season Tao had become a regular within the team and fellow top tier club Dalian Professional signed him on 27 February 2020.

On June 6, 2020, the Chinese Football Association issued Tao a six month suspension from playing professional football as punishment and a 300,000 yuan fine along with several of his team mates for breaking COVID-19 prevention regulation rules while he was with the Chinese U19 team for training. This resulted in him missing the whole 2020 league season. On his return the following season he would finally make his debut on 22 April 2021, in a league game against Changchun Yatai in a 2-1 defeat.   

On 29 April 2022, it was announced that Tao would join newly-promoted Chinese Super League club Wuhan Three Towns. He would go on to make his debut on 3 June 2022, in a league game against Hebei, which ended in a 4-0 victory. After the game he would go on to be part of the squad that won the 2022 Chinese Super League title.

International career
On 24 July 2022, Tao made his international debut in a 0-0 draw against Japan in the 2022 EAFF E-1 Football Championship, as the Chinese FA decided to field the U-23 national team for this senior competition.

Career statistics

Honours

Club
Wuhan Three Towns
Chinese Super League: 2022.

References

External links

2001 births
Living people
Chinese footballers
Chinese expatriate footballers
China youth international footballers
Association football midfielders
Chinese Super League players
Villarreal CF players
Hebei F.C. players
Footballers from Anhui
People from Fuyang
Chinese expatriate sportspeople in Spain
Expatriate footballers in Spain
China under-20 international footballers